Edwin Ayoung (born 1944), better known as Crazy, is a Trinidadian calypsonian. He has been active since the mid-1970s and is one of the most successful artists from Trinidad and Tobago.

Career
Ayoung was born in 1944 at Maraval Road, Port of Spain, Trinidad, one of eleven children to a Chinese Trinidadian father and an Afro-Venezuelan mother. As a youth he showed promise as a cricketer, but chose a career in music. He initially worked under the names Wong Ping and the Mighty Arawak, but was renamed 'Crazy' by fellow calypsonian Fred Farrell due to his extravagant performances.

Crazy made his solo carnival debut in 1975 with "The Electrician", which was also released as a single. He followed this with "Satan's Coming" and "A Great Achievement", before signing for Eddy Grant's Ice Records label, for which he had his first hit, "Dustbin Cover"/"Listen Joffre Serrette". The two songs from the single gained him second place at the National Calypso Monarch finals in 1978.

Crazy was the first artist to sing a "Parang Soca" song (mixing soca and hymnal Latin music) in 1978. His debut album, Crazy's Super Album, was released in 1979 and sold over 35,000 copies in his home country.

Crazy acted in the Trinidad All Theatre Productions' shows Cinderama (1980) and Snokone and the Seven Dwens (1981), and in 1982 toured Europe with the company in their re-enactment of carnival's traditional J'Ouvert opening ceremony.

In 1982, he finished joint second at Road March with "Uncle Crazy". In 1984 he became one of the first soca artists to perform at Reggae Sunsplash. He won Road March in 1985 with "Suck Meh Soucouyant", and finished as runner-up in 1989.

He pioneered the crossover genre chutney soca with his 1989 Road March entry, "Nani Wine", a big hit in North America and the West Indies in 1989.

After a relative lack of success in the early 1990s, which included an album recorded with Byron Lee, his fortunes improved in 1997 with the release of the album Still Crazy After 25 Years, the same year finishing third in the Soca Chutney Monarch competition and reaching the final of International Soca Monarch.

He continues to feature in major contests, and in 2007 placed 5th at Road March with "Cold Sweat".

In 2012 he pioneered another new style, "Trini-style reggae", releasing a Trini-reggae cover of "Hotel California".

In 2013 Crazy was named in a list of the top 50 calypsonians of the 20th century by the Trinbago Unified Calypsonians' Organisation (TUCO).

In 2015 he headlined the Pan New England Steelband Festival in Blue Hill, Maine.

Lyrical content
Crazy's lyrics are often humorous, but have also incorporated political themes. While many of his lyrics have been risqué, in 2011, he appealed to parang soca artists to keep lyrics 'holy' in the runup to Christmas. In contrast to the homophobic lyrics of many calypsonians, Crazy's "Take ah Man", with its line "If yuh cyar get ah wooman, take ah man", was adopted as a gay anthem in Trinidad and Tobago. He wrote "Stop the Crime" in response to the murder of state prosecutor Dana Seetahal and general level of crime in Trinidad.

Discography

Albums
Crazy's Super Album (1979), Crazy
Madness Is Gladness (1980), Crazy
My Method of Madness (1980), Crazy
Mad Man Jam (1982), CCM
New Direction (1983), Kalico
Fire (1985), Crazy
Here I Am (1986), Crazy
Chief Crazy (1987), Crazy
Crazy Crazy (1981), Kai Soca
Nani Wine (1989), Trinity
Soca Beti (1990), Benab
Jump Leh We Jump (1991), Dynamic
Crazymania (1992), JWP
Let's Go Crazy (1993), JWP
Craziah Than Ever (1994), JWP
Crazy For You (1995), JWP
Wildness (1996), JWP
Still Crazy After 25 Years (1997), JWP
Ah Crazy Again (Back to Basics) (1999), JWP
Dangerously Crazy (2001), JWP
Masquerade (2002), JWP
Best of Crazy (2002), JWP
Crazy On De Loose (2003), JWP
Trnidad Crazy (2004), Hometown Music
Sweet Madness (2005), Hometown Music
De Maddest (2006)
Cold Sweat (2007)
Unstoppable (2008)
Crazylicious (2009)
Evergreen (2010)
The Recipe (2012)

EPs
Crazy 2011 (2011)
Crazy's Crazy Singles 2012 (2012)
Crazy 2013 (2013)

Singles
"Chinaman" (1974), Strakers
"Religious Procession"/"The Electrician" (1975), Crazy
"Satan's Coming" (1976), MAM/Charlie's
"Band Leaders Ain't Care" (1977), MAM/Bellini
"A Great Achievement" (1977), MAM/Bellini
"Dustbin Cover"/"Listen Joffre Serrette" (1978), Ice
"Parang Soca"/"Guadeloupe Chick" (1979)
"Crazy’s Contribution To The International Year Of The Child" (1979), Crazy
"Muchacha" (1979)
"Don't Try That" (1980)
"Sweet Daisy" (1983), Kalico
"Ain’t Boung For You" (1984)
"Drive It" (1988)
"Christmas Parang Parti" (1990), Charlie's
"De Party Now Start" (1992)
"Parang Soca" (1992), Cahrlie's
"Dis Is How" (1994), JWP
"D'Ride" (1998)
"Qualified Cashier" (2003), Hometown Music

Digital singles/tracks
"Phone Card" (2008)
"When Steel Talks" (2009)
"Rub It Up" (2010)
"Patrick Manning Must Go" (2010)
"More Percy" (2010)
Crazy 2012 (2012)
"I For Kamla" (2013)
"Big Band" (2013)
"De Bull" (2013)

References

External links
 
 Crazy Discography on The Calypso Archives

1944 births
Living people
20th-century Trinidad and Tobago male singers
20th-century Trinidad and Tobago singers
Trinidad and Tobago people of Chinese descent
Calypsonians
Soca musicians
Trinidad and Tobago people of Venezuelan descent
21st-century Trinidad and Tobago male singers
21st-century Trinidad and Tobago singers